Charlotta is a Danish, Finnish and Swedish feminine given name that is an alternate form of Charlotte and a feminine form of the masculine version of Charlot and Carl. Notable people referred to by this name include the following:

Given name

Charlotta Almlöf (1813 – 1882), Swedish stage actress
Charlotta Arfwedson (1776 - 1862), Swedish countess and artist
Charlotta Aurora De Geer (1779–1834), Swedish countess, salonist and courtier
Charlotta Bass (1874 – 1969), American educator, newspaper publisher-editor, and civil rights activist
Charlotta Berger (1784 – 1852), Swedish writer, translator, poet and songwriter
Charlotta Cedercreutz (1736–1815), Swedish artist, lady-in-waiting and baroness
Charlotta Cederström (1760 – 1832), Swedish dilettante artist, salon hostess, and baroness
Charlotta Deland (1807 - 1864), Swedish stage actress
Charlotta Djurström (1807 – 1877), Swedish stage actress
Charlotta Eriksson (1794 – 1862), Swedish stage actress
Charlotta Frölich (1698 – 1770), Swedish writer, historian, agronomist and poet
Charlotta Fougberg (born 1985), Swedish athlete who specializes in steeplechase
Charlotta Jonsson (born 1973), Swedish actress
Charlotta Löfgren (1720 – 1784), Swedish poet
Charlotta Lönnqvist (1815 – 1891), Finnish cultural personality
Charlotta Malm-Reuterholm (1768–1845), Finnish artist, painter, writer and noble
Charlotta Öberg (1818 – 1856), Swedish poet
Charlotta Pisinger (born 1960), Danish medical doctor and professor in tobacco prevention
Charlotta Raa-Winterhjelm (1838 – 1907), Swedish actor 
Charlotta Richardy (1751-1831), Swedish industrialist
Charlotta Roos (1771-1809), Swedish medium
Charlotta Schlyter, Swedish diplomat and ambassador
Charlotta Seuerling (1782/84 – 1828), blind Swedish concert singer, harpsichordist, composer and poet
Charlotta Skjöldebrand (1791-1866), Swedish court official
Charlotta Sörenstam (born 1973), Swedish professional golfer
Charlotta Sparre (1719 – 1795), Swedish noble and courtier
Charlotta Elisabeth van der Lith (1700 – 1753), Dutch plantation owner
Charlotta von Liewen (1683 – 1735), Swedish countess
Charlotta Wersäll (1858 – 1924), Swedish noblewoman

Middle name
Anna Charlotta Schröderheim (1754 – 1791), Swedish noble and salonist
Catharina Charlotta Swedenmarck (1744 - 1813), Swedish-Finnish writer and poet
Eleonora Charlotta d'Albedyhll (1770 – 1835), Swedish countess, poet and salon holder
Elisabet Charlotta Piper (1787 - 1860), Swedish court official
Elisabeth Charlotta Karsten (1789–1856), Swedish painter
Hanna Charlotta Bäcklund, murder victim
Hedvig Amalia Charlotta Klinckowström (1777 - 1810), Swedish countess, courtier and artist
Hedvig Charlotta Nordenflycht (1718 – 1763), Swedish poet, feminist and salon hostess
Helena Charlotta Åkerhielm (1786- 1828), Swedish dramatist and translator
Lovisa Charlotta Borgman (1798 – 1884), Swedish violinist

See also

Carlotta (name)
Charlott
Charlotte (given name)

Notes

Feminine given names
 Danish feminine given names
 Swedish feminine given names
 Finnish feminine given names